61673 "Spirit of Sandringham" is an LNER B17 class 4-6-0 steam locomotive which was being built in Llangollen on the Llangollen Railway by the B17 Steam Locomotive Trust. Similar to that of 60163 Tornado which was built as no original members of the LNER Peppercorn A1 class were preserved, no original B17's were preserved.

Construction of 61673 started at the workshops of the Llangollen Railway, however with the closure of the latter's engineering business in 2020, the completed Mainframes were moved to the workshops of CTL Seal LTD in Sheffield in October 2020.

"Spirit of Sandringham" will be completed to mainline standards, being capable of hauling railtours on the UK national network and available to visit heritage railways.

Background 
The original B17's were built from 1928-1937 with the construction of the seventy three engines being split between :- North British Locomotive Company, Darlington Works & Robert Stephenson and Company.

By 1960, withdrawal of the class was well underway with only seventeen remaining in service at the start of the year.  The final original B17 to be withdrawn was No.61668 Bradford City, which was withdrawn in August 1960 and cut up not that long after withdrawal.

The longest working life of a B17 was 31 years by No.61608 Gunton & the shortest being 21 years for No.61667 Bradford.

It was announced in Steam Railway magazine issue 349, on 1 May 2008 that a group planned to built two B17's (one being a replica of 61662 "Manchester United" while the other would be numbered 61673 and given the name "Spirit of Sandringham".

No. 61673's construction was first being undertaken in Llangollen by the B17 Steam Locomotive Trust while the replica engine was being built at a private site by the 61662 appeal. In November 2020 it was announced that the 61662 project was being terminated.

With the cessation of the Llangollen Railway's engineering business in 2020, the frames of 61673 were moved to CTL Seal LTD in Sheffield in October 2020, for construction to continue.

Name, number and liveries 
A small number of B17's wore the LNER's famous Apple green livery as well as NE unlined and lined black, and for a brief period one even emerged in LNER Apple Green with British Railways lettering on the tender. However B17's were mainly seen in BR green with either the early emblem (pre 1956) or the later crest (post 1956). It's not yet known which livery the completed engine will wear first and it's expected that a decision will be reached near to when the engine is completed.

Project milestones 

 .
 .
 .
 .
 Feb 2018: Static Mainframe approved by Ricardo Rail LTD at Llangollen.
 August 2020: Hornblocks ordered from William Cook Cast Products LTD.
January 2021: Hornblocks cast by William Cook Cast Products, Sheffield.

References

External links 
B17 Steam Locomotive Trust website
B17SLT Latest News
 B17 Trust Twitter page - https://twitter.com/B17SLT

Individual locomotives of Great Britain
Steam locomotives of the 21st century
Standard gauge steam locomotives of Great Britain
4-6-0 locomotives